Frédéric Lagrange, 2nd count of Lagrange (21 June 1815, Dangu - 22 November 1883, Paris) was a French politician. His father was the Napoleonic general Joseph Lagrange and his father-in-law was the Belgian businessman and diplomat Joseph de Riquet de Caraman. He was deputy for Gers then senator for Gers, both under the French Second Empire.

He was also a noted racehorse owner and breeder. He set up a stud in England under Tom Jennings Senior and another in France headed by Henry Jennings. In 1856 he bought Monarque, who had won the Prix du Jockey Club the previous year whilst owned by Alexandre Aumont, and used him as a stud. His horse Fille de l'Air won The Oaks in 1864 and another of his horses, Gladiateur, won The Derby and the Grand Prix de Paris, both in 1865, and the Ascot Gold Cup in 1866. Gladiateur became the first foreign-bred horse to win the three British Classic Races which subsequently became known as the Triple Crown.  Additionally, his horse, Verneuil, also won the Ascot Cup in 1878.

Notes

Sources
 

1815 births
1883 deaths
Sportspeople from Eure
Counts of the Second French Empire
Politicians from Normandy
Bonapartists
Members of the National Legislative Assembly of the French Second Republic
Members of the 1st Corps législatif of the Second French Empire
Members of the 2nd Corps législatif of the Second French Empire
Members of the 3rd Corps législatif of the Second French Empire
Members of the 4th Corps législatif of the Second French Empire
French racehorse owners and breeders
Owners of Epsom Derby winners
Officiers of the Légion d'honneur